S. T. Herat was the 35th Surveyor General of Sri Lanka. He was appointed in 1989, succeeding S. D. F. C. Nanayakkara, and held the office until 1991. He was succeeded by E. M. Perera.

References

H